TeamViewer is a German remote access and remote control computer software, allowing maintenance of computers and other devices. It was first released in 2005,  and its functionality has expanded step by step. TeamViewer is proprietary software, but does not require registration and is free of charge for non-commercial use. It has been installed on more than two billion devices. TeamViewer is the core product of developer TeamViewer AG.

History
Rossmanith GmbH released the first version of TeamViewer software in 2005, at that time still based on the VNC project. The IT service provider wanted to avoid unnecessary trips to customers and perform tasks such as installing software remotely. The development was very successful and gave rise to TeamViewer GmbH, which today operates as TeamViewer Germany GmbH and is part of TeamViewer AG.

Operating systems
TeamViewer is available for most desktop computers with common operating systems, including Microsoft Windows and Windows Server, as well as Apple's macOS. There are also packages for several Linux distributions and derivatives, for example, Debian, Ubuntu, Red Hat, and Fedora Linux. Besides, there is Raspberry Pi OS, a Debian variant for the Raspberry Pi.

TeamViewer is also available for smartphones and tablets running Android or Apple's iOS/iPadOS operating system, very limited functionality on Linux based operating systems. Support for Windows Phone and Windows Mobile has been phased out after Microsoft discontinued support for the two operating systems.

Functionality

The functionality of TeamViewer differs depending on the device and variant or version of the software. The core of TeamViewer is remote access to computers and other endpoints as well as their control and maintenance. After the connection is established, the remote screen is visible to the user at the other endpoint. Both endpoints can send and receive files as well as access a shared clipboard, for example. Besides, some functions facilitate team collaboration, such as audio and video transmissions via IP telephony.

In recent years, the functionality of the software has been optimized in particular for use in large companies. For this purpose, the enterprise variant TeamViewer Tensor was developed. With TeamViewer Pilot, TeamViewer sells software for remote support with augmented reality elements. TeamViewer offers interfaces to other applications and services, for example from Microsoft (Teams), Salesforce, and ServiceNow. The solution is available in nearly all countries and supports over 30 languages.

License policy

Private users who use TeamViewer for non-commercial purposes may use the software free of charge. Fees must be paid for the commercial use of the software. Companies and other commercial customers must sign up for a subscription. A one-time purchase of the application is no longer possible since the switch from a license to an annual subscription model. Linus Sebastian, a Canadian YouTube and businessman, documenting how TeamViewer was contacting him at 'unsociable hours' to try to have him convert his perpetual license to the subscription license. The prices for using the software are scaled according to the number of users as well as the number of concurrent sessions. Updates are released monthly and are included for all users.

For cancellation of the annual subscriptions, it must be done within 28 days of subscribing to the service or upon the renewal of the license. Otherwise, the license will be automatically renewed for the following year. These renewal terms, contained with the term and conditions, was allegedly 'unclear' and 'predatory' to its customers. This was also separately challenged in California' courts, which found that TeamViewer's disclosure, seeking consent, and acknowledgement of the auto-renewal to be sufficient, thus legal.

Security
Incoming and outgoing connections are equally possible via the Internet or local networks. If desired, TeamViewer can run as a Windows system service, which allows unattended access via TeamViewer. There is also a portable version of the software that runs completely without installation, for example via a USB data carrier.

The connection is established using automatically generated unique IDs and passwords. Before each connection, the TeamViewer network servers check the validity of the IDs of both endpoints. Security is enhanced by the fingerprint, which allows users to provide additional proof of the remote device's identity. Passwords are protected against brute force attacks, especially by increasing the waiting time between connection attempts exponentially. TeamViewer provides additional security features, such as two-factor authentication, block and allow lists.

Before establishing a connection, TeamViewer first checks the configuration of the device and the network to detect restrictions imposed by firewalls and other security systems. Usually, a direct TCP/UDP connection can be established so that no additional ports need to be opened. Otherwise, TeamViewer falls back on other paths such as an HTTP tunnel.

Regardless of the connection type selected, data is transferred exclusively via secure data channels. TeamViewer includes end-to-end encryption based on RSA (4096 bits) and AES (256 bits). According to the manufacturer, man-in-the-middle attacks are principally not possible. [16] This is to be guaranteed by the signed key exchange of two key pairs.

Abuse

Support scam
TeamViewer and similar programs can be abused for technical support scams. In this process, attackers pretend to be employees of well-known companies to gain control over their victims' computers. They then use a pretext to obtain money from their victims. For this reason, the British Internet provider TalkTalk permanently blocked the software's data traffic. TeamViewer condemns all forms of misuse of the software, provides tips for safe use, and provides a way to investigate corresponding incidents.

Account access
In June 2016, hundreds of TeamViewer users reported having their computers accessed by an unauthorized address in China and bank accounts misappropriated. TeamViewer attributed the outcome to user's "careless password use" and denied all responsibility, saying "neither was TeamViewer hacked nor is there a security hole, TeamViewer is safe to use and has proper security measures in place. Our evidence points to careless use as the cause of the reported issue, a few extra steps will prevent potential abuse."

See also
 Comparison of remote desktop software
 Remote desktop software

References

External links
 

Linux remote administration software
MacOS remote administration software
Portable software
Proprietary cross-platform software
Proprietary software that uses Qt
Remote administration software
Remote desktop
Software that uses Qt
Universal Windows Platform apps
Virtual Network Computing
Web conferencing
Windows remote administration software
Software companies of Germany
Software companies established in 2005